Matej Paločko (born 26 May 1996) is a Slovak professional ice hockey forward currently playing for HK Poprad of the Slovak Extraliga.

Career
Paločko began his career with HK Poprad, playing in their various Jr. teams in 2013. After that he played in Jr. teams for HC Bílí Tygři Liberec between 2014 and 2016.

Paločko previously played for HC Benátky nad Jizerou, HK Spišská Nová Ves and Nice hockey Côte d'Azur of the Ligue Magnus.

Career statistics

Regular season and playoffs

International

References

External links

 

1996 births
Living people
Slovak ice hockey forwards
HK Spišská Nová Ves players
HK Poprad players
HC Benátky nad Jizerou players
Les Aigles de Nice players
Sportspeople from Košice
Slovak expatriate ice hockey players in the Czech Republic
Slovak expatriate sportspeople in France
Expatriate ice hockey players in France